Gavin James Bower (born 28 October 1982, in Lancashire) is a British writer, lecturer and editor. His first novel, Dazed & Aroused, was published by Naim Attallah's Quartet Books in July 2009.

Graduating from the University of Sheffield with a BA in History in 2004, he then interned at Dazed & Confused magazine in London. He was asked to model for the upcoming issue and subsequently joined modelling agencies in London, Paris and Milan, taking part in Paris Fashion Week shows for John Galliano and Hermes.

He has contributed to the Guardian, 3:AM Magazine and the Sunday Telegraph.

His second novel, Made in Britain, was published in September 2011.

In 2014 he joined the writing team for EastEnders, with his first episode being broadcast on 9 September.

Bibliography
 2009 – Dazed & Aroused (Quartet Books)
 2011 – Made in Britain (Quartet Books)
 2013 – Claude Cahun - The Soldier with No Name (Zero Books)

References

External links
Website
Independent review of Dazed & Aroused
3:AM Magazine interview
Observer review of Made in Britain
 Staff profile

Living people
21st-century British novelists
1982 births
British soap opera writers
British male novelists
21st-century British male writers
British male television writers
21st-century British screenwriters